The Great Northern P-2 was a class of 28 4-8-2 "Mountain" type steam locomotives built by the Baldwin Locomotive Works in 1923 and operated by the Great Northern Railway until the late 1950s.

The locomotives were built as passenger locomotives and the class had the honor of pulling the first Empire Builder train.

Today, two P-2s survive, No. 2507 is on display in Wishram, WA and No. 2523 is on display in Willmar, MN.

History

Design
Built as passenger locomotives in 1923, they were used to haul passenger trains throughout the Great Northern. They were built to speed up passenger trains on the mainline and have replaced the earlier P-1 Class of "Mountains" of 1914, as they were deemed too slow for passenger service. While most Great Northern steam locomotives had a Belpaire firebox, the P-2s had a radial stay firebox. The first 18 were delivered as oil burners and the last 10 were delivered as coal burners. In service, they were limited to 50 mph, but managed up to 4,800 miles a month and were rated at 10-12 heavyweight passenger cars up the 1.8% Walton Hill at 18 mph. Helper service is provided up the 1.65% grade outside of the St. Paul Union Depot if trains consisted of 10 or more cars. Later in their service life, their boiler pressure was increased from 200 psi to 210 psi, increasing their tractive effort from 54,838 to 57,580 lbs. About half of the class received roller bearings. The P-2s were deemed as excellent passenger locomotives.

Revenue service
The locomotives pulled passenger trains such as the Empire Builder and Oriental Limited and was the first to pull the former. While their performance in passenger service was excellent, they were replaced by the S-2 Class of Northerns in Empire Builder service, regulating them to other passenger trains and freight trains. As the Great Northern dieselized, retirement of the P-2s began in April 1955 and by April 1958, all have been retired.

Accidents and incidents
No. 2507, while pulling train #27, the Fast Mail, hit a landslide near Picnic Point, south of Mukilteo, Washington in the pre-dawn hours of February 18, 1948. The engineer and fireman survived, but were both injured when the slide rolled the engine, tender and a baggage car off the track and went over the rock sea wall into Puget Sound. The locomotive was eventually repaired and returned to service.

Preservation
Two P-2s survived into preservation.

Great Northern 2507 was retired in December 1957, eventually sold to the Spokane, Portland and Seattle for display at Maryhill, WA and dedicated on September 3, 1966. It was later moved to Pasco, WA for restoration, but it was unsuccessful. The locomotive was moved again in 2003 to the depot in Wishram, WA, where it still resides.
Great Northern 2523 was retired in April 1958 and donated to the city of Willmar, MN on October 7, 1965. It is currently displayed at the Kandiyohi County Historical Society.

Roster

See also
Great Northern P-1
Great Northern S-2

References

Great Northern Railway (U.S.)
4-8-2 locomotives
Baldwin locomotives
Passenger locomotives
Preserved steam locomotives of the United States
Railway locomotives introduced in 1923
P-2
Standard gauge locomotives of the United States
Steam locomotives of the United States